David Siame (born 8 October 1976) is a retired Zambian football striker.

References

1976 births
Living people
Zambian footballers
Zambia international footballers
Zamsure F.C. players
Association football forwards